Deribas may refer to:

Terenty Deribas (1883–1938), Soviet official
José de Ribas (Osip Mikhailovich Deribas) (1749–1800), founder of Odessa